Bastien Damiens (18 January 1995 – 6 September 2015) was a French slalom canoeist who competed at the international level from 2011 until his death in 2015. He was born in Montreuil, Pas-de-Calais.

Damiens won gold in the K1 team event at the 2012 European Canoe Slalom Championships in Augsburg.

Damiens died at the age of 20 after falling from the fifth floor of a building.

References

1995 births
2015 deaths
French male canoeists
People from Montreuil, Pas-de-Calais
Sportspeople from Pas-de-Calais